William Leroy "P. J." Pope, Jr. (born February 26, 1984) is a former American football running back. He was signed by the Chicago Bears as an undrafted free agent in 2006. He played college football at Bowling Green.

Pope has also played for the Green Bay Packers and Denver Broncos.

Early years
Pope attended Wyoming High School in Wyoming, Ohio, where he excelled in baseball and football. During his senior year, Pope ran for 2,230 rushing yards and 36 touchdowns, enough to help him win the "Southern Ohio Player of the Year" Award.

College career
During Pope's career at Bowling Green State University, he managed to become the school's third all-time leading rusher. He became the only player in the school's history to record 3,000 rushing and 1,000 receiving yards.

Professional career

Chicago Bears
The Chicago Bears signed Pope as an undrafted free agent before the 2006 NFL preseason to compensate for the absence of starting running backs Thomas Jones and Cedric Benson. The Bears later cut Pope from the team on September 9, but was shortly re-signed onto the practice squad.

Green Bay Packers
The Green Bay Packers signed Pope from the Bears' practice squad on October 31, 2006. On August 24, 2007, he was cut along with 11 other players from Green Bay.

Chicago Bears (second stint)
Pope was re-signed to the Bears' practice squad in September 2007. He remained there the entire season and spent the 2008 preseason with the team before being waived on August 29.

Denver Broncos
On August 31, 2008, Pope was signed to the practice squad of the Denver Broncos He was released on October 20, only to be re-signed to following day. Pope was promoted to the Broncos active roster on November 4, a day after running backs Andre Hall and Michael Pittman were placed on season-ending injured reserve. Pope became the starter when Peyton Hillis also went on injured reserve.

Pope was waived by the Broncos on February 11, 2009.

Post NFL Career
Pope was the 8th grade football coach at Wyoming Middle School. As of 2013 he is a varsity assistant at Shroder High School in Cincinnati.

References

External links
Bowling Green Falcons bio
Denver Broncos bio
Chicago Bears bio

1984 births
Living people
Players of American football from Cincinnati
African-American players of American football
American football running backs
Bowling Green Falcons football players
Chicago Bears players
Green Bay Packers players
Denver Broncos players
21st-century African-American sportspeople
20th-century African-American people